The Security Administration was the counterintelligence branch of the Military of Serbia and Montenegro.

History
When the Army of the Federal Republic of Yugoslavia (Vojska Jugoslavije) was formed on 20 May 1992, the Security Administration, former KOS, was moved from the Federal Secretariat of People's Defence (Savezni sekretarijat za narodnu odbranu) to the General Staff (Generalštab).

In 2002, it was split into the Military Security Agency (VBA) and the Military Intelligence Agency (VOA).

See also
 State Security Service (SDB)

References

External links

1992 establishments in Serbia
Government agencies established in 1992
2002 disestablishments in Serbia
Government agencies disestablished in 2002
Yugoslav intelligence agencies
Military of Serbia and Montenegro
Military intelligence agencies